Bennie Turner (August 21, 1948 – November 27, 2012) was an American broadcaster, lawyer, and legislator.

Born in West Point, Mississippi, Turner went to Mary Holmes College, Mississippi State University, and University of Mississippi School of Law, where he got his law degree. He served in the Mississippi State Senate as a Democrat from 1992 until his death. He died in Jackson, Mississippi.

Notes

1948 births
2012 deaths
People from West Point, Mississippi
Mississippi State University alumni
University of Mississippi School of Law alumni
Mississippi lawyers
Democratic Party Mississippi state senators
20th-century American lawyers
20th-century American politicians
21st-century American politicians